Thomas Oliver (January 5, 1733/34 – November 20, 1815) was the last royal lieutenant-governor of the Province of Massachusetts Bay.

Biography
Born in Antigua to a wealthy plantation owner, Thomas Oliver graduated from Harvard College in 1753.  In 1760 he married Elizabeth Vassall, who was from another family of West Indies plantation owners that had settled in Massachusetts.  The Vassalls were also connected by marriage to the politically powerful Phips family.  Oliver was active in the militia but did not involve himself in politics. In 1766 he commissioned the mansion to be built by John Nutting (loyalist) now at 33 Elmwood Avenue, Cambridge, later called Elmwood, for his growing family.

When the provincial lieutenant governor, Andrew Oliver died in 1774, Oliver was appointed his successor by King George III and his government ministers, who may have believed him to be a brother or other relative of Andrew Oliver.  On September 2, 1774, Oliver saw a crowd of four thousand angry citizens entering Cambridge and traveled to Boston to advise General Thomas Gage not to send troops against them. On his return, the crowd, defying the advice of their political leaders, surrounded Oliver's house and forced him to sign a resignation.  Oliver fled to Boston, remaining there for over a year. He chaired one meeting of the Massachusetts Council after Gage's departure. When the British troops sailed to Halifax in March 1776, Oliver went with them, going on to England.  He was proscribed under the Massachusetts Banishment Act in 1778, and his estate confiscated. The Continental Army had already used his house as a hospital during the Siege of Boston.

Oliver's wife died after their flight to England, and he married Harriet Freeman in Antigua in 1781. Two years later in 1783, Oliver was recorded as owning  11 slaves: Buff, Cato, Jerry, Jeoffry, Samuel, Mira, Jude, Sarah, Violet, Jenny, and "Young Jerry". He had six children by his first wife, and two with his second.  He died in Bristol in 1815, and was buried at St Paul's Church, Bristol. The British government continued to recognize him as lieutenant governor of Massachusetts and pay his salary until he died.

References

Jackson, Robert. History of the Oliver, Vassall, and Royall Houses Dorchester, Cambridge, and Medford
Paige, Lucius R. (1877). History of Cambridge, Massachusetts: 1630-1877. Boston: H.O. Houghton and Company.
Stark, James Henry. The Loyalists of Massachusetts

1733 births
1815 deaths
American slave owners
Harvard College alumni
Harvard College Loyalists in the American Revolution
Lieutenant Governors of colonial Massachusetts
People from colonial Boston
People of Massachusetts in the American Revolution
Politicians from Cambridge, Massachusetts